Soibahadine Ibrahim Ramadani (born 5 March 1949) is a French and Mahoran politician and formerly a member of the Senate of France, representing the island of Mayotte.  He is a member of The Republicans and before that, its predecessor the Union for a Popular Movement. Since 2 April 2015 he is the President of the Departmental Council of Mayotte, the deliberative assembly for the Overseas Department and Region of Mayotte.

References
Page on the Senate website

1949 births
Living people
Presidents of the Departmental Council of Mayotte
Members of the Departmental Council of Mayotte
Mayotte politicians
French Senators of the Fifth Republic
People from Mayotte
Union for a Popular Movement politicians
Senators of Mayotte